Seo Young-hee (born June 13, 1979) is a South Korean actress. She is best known for her supporting role in thriller The Chaser (2008) and her award-winning lead role in horror film Bedevilled (2010).

Filmography

Film

Television series

Music video

Theater

Awards and nominations

References

External links
 
 
 

South Korean film actresses
South Korean television actresses
South Korean stage actresses
Actresses from Seoul
Living people
Dongguk University alumni
20th-century South Korean actresses
21st-century South Korean actresses
1979 births